Gipson is a surname. Notable people with the surname include:

Andy Gipson (born 1976), American politician
Charles Gipson (born 1972), American baseball player
Fred Gipson (1908–1973), American writer
Graham Gipson (born 1932), Australian sprinter
Helen Gipson (born 1961), British Scrabble player
Joella Gipson (1929–2012), American musician and mathematician
Ken Gipson (born 1996), German footballer
Lawrence H. Gipson (1880–1971), American historian
Mack Gipson (1931-1995), American Petroleum Geologist and University Professor
Marlies Gipson (born 1987), American women's basketball player
Séverine Gipson (born 1970), French politician
Simon Gipson, Australian schoolteacher
Tashaun Gipson (born 1990), American football player 
Teddy Gipson (born 1980), American basketball player
Trevis Gipson (born 1997), American football player

See also
Gibson (disambiguation)